Matt LeBlanc is an American actor, comedian, writer, and producer.

LeBlanc gained worldwide recognition for his role as Joey Tribbiani in the American sitcom Friends (1994-2004). He followed the series within a short lived spinoff series featured on his character entitled, Joey (2004-2006). He then starred as himself in the critically acclaimed British-American series Episodes (2011-2017). He then starred as Adam Burns in the CBS sitcom Man with a Plan (2016-2020).

He has received various awards and nominations including seven Primetime Emmy Award for Outstanding Lead Actor in a Comedy Series nominations for his work in Friends and Episodes. He also received eight Screen Actors Guild Award nominations winning in 1995 for Outstanding Performance by an Ensemble in a Comedy Series with the cast of Friends.

Major associations

Primetime Emmy Awards

Golden Globe Awards

Screen Actors Guild Awards

Miscellaneous awards

American Comedy Awards

Nickelodeon Kids' Choice Awards

People's Choice Awards

Teen Choice Awards

Television Critics Association Awards

Satellite Awards

TV Guide Awards

References 

Lists of awards received by American actor